The Nokia 7650 is a 2.5G consumer-oriented smartphone belonging to the fashion and experimental (7xxx) series. It was introduced in Barcelona on 19 November 2001, and was described by CEO Jorma Ollila as the company's most important launch of that year.

Feature-rich, it was the first Nokia phone with a built-in camera (VGA resolution), and thus its imaging capabilities was widely marketed. It has a large (at the time) 2.1" colour display with a resolution of 176x208 pixels. The 7650 was also the company's first to feature Multimedia Messaging Service (MMS), and it also has Bluetooth and GPRS connectivities (although to much criticism did not support Bluetooth headsets). It was also the first Nokia phone with sliding keypad, the second being the Series 40-based Nokia 6111, released in 2005.

In addition it was the first Series 60 platform device (which would go on to power the majority of Nokia smartphones for many years after), as well as the first mass market Symbian OS device to be released, allowing the sideloading of both Java and EPOC applications. These factors made the 7650 much-hyped at the time, especially as it came almost four years after the formation of Symbian Ltd. It was eventually released on 26 June 2002 for around €600. Good sales of the 7650 helped Symbian OS to become the top product in the European "handheld devices market" in Q3 2002, above Palm OS and Windows CE. By this time its successor Nokia 3650 was introduced.

The handset's release was promoted in conjunction with the science fiction film Minority Report.

The 7650's significance for its time has been hailed in later years, with many considering it as being one of the most important mobile devices and one of Nokia's most iconic products.

Technical specifications 
The Nokia 7650 has a 32-bit RISC CPU, based on ARM-9 series, a 104 MHz CPU clock, 4 MB of non-expandable main memory (RAM) (3.6 MB available to the user) and 16 MB ROM.

Other features 
E-mail and MMS client
Organizer and SyncML
HSCSD and GPRS
Java and EPOC application support

References 

Nokia smartphones
Symbian devices
Digital cameras
Mobile phones introduced in 2002
Mobile phones with infrared transmitter
Slider phones